Ante Jazić (born February 26, 1976) is a Canadian retired soccer player.

Club career

Youth

Growing up in Bedford, Jazić started his soccer career as a youth player for Scotia Soccer Club. As a senior level, he played for one the nation's strongest amateur teams at the time, Halifax King of Donair, and a year with Dalhousie University in which he was named All-Canadian CIAU.

Professional
Jazić began his professional career by joining NK Hrvatski Dragovoljac in 1997 after a successful try-out arranged by an uncle in Croatia. After two years with Dragovoljac, he joined Croatian First League club Hajduk Split for the 1999-00 and 2000–01 seasons.

Jazić then played four seasons with Rapid Vienna in the Austrian Football Bundesliga. He played for FC Kuban Krasnodar in the Russian Premier League in the 2006 season. Kuban were relegated to the Russian First Division for 2005. On June 27, 2006, he signed a contract with Los Angeles Galaxy of Major League Soccer, where he would spend the next two years.

On January 15, 2009, Jazić was traded to Chivas USA along with the Galaxy's 35th- and 49th-overall picks in the 2009 MLS SuperDraft in exchange for Chivas' second-round pick (19th-overall), which the Galaxy used to select defender A. J. DeLaGarza.

Jazić re-signed with Chivas USA for the 2012 season, his fourth with the club, on December 2, 2011.

Jazić has worked as head coach of the Canada under-15 national team.

International career
He made his debut for Canada in a May 1998 friendly match against Macedonia.

International goals
Scores and results list Canada's goal tally first.

Personal life
Jazić is married to Annemarie Dillard Jazic, whose family started Dillard's department stores.

Honours

Club
Hajduk Split
 Prva HNL: 2000–01
 Croatian Cup: 1999-2000

References

External links

 (archive)
Ante Jazic Interview

1976 births
Living people
People from Bedford, Nova Scotia
Sportspeople from Halifax, Nova Scotia
Canadian people of Croatian descent
Association football defenders
Soccer people from Nova Scotia
Canadian soccer players
Canada men's international soccer players
2007 CONCACAF Gold Cup players
Canadian expatriate soccer players
Canadian expatriate sportspeople in Croatia
Canadian expatriate sportspeople in Austria
Canadian expatriate sportspeople in Russia
Canadian expatriate sportspeople in the United States
NK Hrvatski Dragovoljac players
HNK Hajduk Split players
SK Rapid Wien players
FC Kuban Krasnodar players
LA Galaxy players
Chivas USA players
Croatian Football League players
Austrian Football Bundesliga players
Russian Premier League players
Major League Soccer players
Expatriate footballers in Austria
Expatriate footballers in Croatia
Expatriate footballers in Russia
Expatriate soccer players in the United States
Dalhousie University alumni